Julia is a surname. Notable people with the surname include:

Bernard Julia (born 1952), French physicist
Didier Julia (born 1934), French politician
Dominique Julia (born 1940), French historian
Gaston Julia (1893–1978), French mathematician
Javier Julia, Argentine cinematographer and film editor
José Julia (born 1979), Spanish cyclist
Martha Julia (born 1973), Mexican actress
Raúl Juliá (1940–1994), Puerto Rican actor
Charles H. Juliá, Puerto Rican senator